Fremont is the name of more than one location in the U.S. state of New York:
Fremont, Steuben County, New York
Fremont, Sullivan County, New York